is a 1966 Japanese drama film directed and edited by Masahiro Shinoda. The film was scripted by Japanese author and politician Shintarō Ishihara.

Plot
Seeking revenge against the guard who tormented him, a young man returns to the island where he was imprisoned in reform school. But his plans for vengeance are disturbed when he encounters a strange and beautiful young woman.

References

External links
 

1966 films
Japanese drama films
Shintaro Ishihara
1960s Japanese films